Kim Bi-o (born 21 August 1990) is a South Korean professional golfer who played on the PGA Tour.

Amateur career
As an amateur, Kim won the Korean Amateur Open and Japan Amateur Golf Championship in 2008. He also represented Asia/Pacific in the 2008 Bonallack Trophy and South Korea in the 2008 Eisenhower Trophy.

Professional career
Kim turned professional in 2009 and joined his home Korean Tour for 2010, winning the Johnnie Walker Open by 6 strokes.

At the end of the 2010 season, he entered qualifying school for the PGA Tour and gained his playing rights in eleventh place. He lost his PGA Tour card after finishing 162nd on the money list. He split his 2012 season between the OneAsia Tour and Web.com Tour. Kim won for the second time as a professional in 2011 at the Nanshan China Masters on the OneAsia Tour. He picked up his third victory at the GS Caltex Maekyung Open on the OneAsia Tour in May 2012. Along with his two victories on the OneAsia Tour in 2012, Kim won the tour's Order of Merit. With his two victories he was the leading money winner on the Korean Tour in 2012 even though he only played three events. Kim's highest World Ranking was 200th, in May 2012.

In 2013, he played on the Web.com Tour for a second season, but made only two cuts in 15 tournaments.

From 2014, he has played mainly on the Korean Tour. From 2014 to 2018 he had little success and had long spells outside the top 1000 in the world rankings. During this period his best finishes were to be fourth in the 2015 Gunsan CC Open and the 2017 DGB Financial Group Daegu Gyeongbuk Open

Kim showed a return to form in 2019. He won the NS HomeShopping Gunsan CC Jeonbuk Open, the second event of the 2019 Korean Tour season, his first win since 2012. In late September he had his second win of the season, the DGB Financial Group Volvik Daegu Gyeongbuk Open.

On 1 October 2019, the Korean Professional Golfers Association announced that Kim has been suspended for three years after making an obscene gesture during the final round of the DGB Financial Group Volvik Daegu Gyeongbuk Open, which Kim won. On the 16th hole, after a cellphone camera shutter went off during his downswing, Kim turned and flipped off the crowd, before slamming his club into the ground. Kim apologized for the gesture and decided not to appeal the suspension. His suspension was reduced to one year on 24 October, but the 10 million won fine and 120 hours of community service remained.

Amateur wins
2008 Korean Amateur Open, Japan Amateur Golf Championship

Professional wins (9)

Asian Tour wins (1)

1Co-sanctioned by the Korean Tour

OneAsia Tour wins (3)

1Co-sanctioned by the Korean Tour

OneAsia Tour playoff record (1–0)

Korean Tour wins (8)

1Co-sanctioned by the OneAsia Tour
2Co-sanctioned by the Asian Tour

Results in major championships

T = Tied
CUT = missed the halfway cut
Note: Kim only played in the PGA Championship and the U.S. Open.

Team appearances
Amateur
Eisenhower Trophy (representing South Korea): 2008
Bonallack Trophy (representing Asia/Pacific): 2008

See also
2010 PGA Tour Qualifying School graduates

References

External links

South Korean male golfers
PGA Tour golfers
Yonsei University alumni
Golfers from Seoul
1990 births
Living people